Interview is an American magazine founded in late 1969 by artist Andy Warhol and British journalist John Wilcock. The magazine, nicknamed "The Crystal Ball of Pop", features interviews with celebrities, artists, musicians, and creative thinkers. Interviews were usually unedited or edited in the eccentric fashion of Warhol's books and The Philosophy of Andy Warhol: From A to B and Back Again.

History

Andy Warhol period
Bob Colacello was a film student at Columbia University in 1970 when he got a call from someone at Interview while he was having dinner at his parents’ house in suburban Long Island. Warhol had read a film review Colacello had written for The Village Voice and wanted to meet him. Colacello subsequently began writing film reviews and essays for Interview. After about six months, Colacello was promoted to editor of the magazine, at a salary of $50 a week. (He also received course credits, as he was still working on his master’s degree at Columbia). Colacello brought in his friend and classmate Glenn O’Brien as an assistant. Colacello's first issue featured film 1940s-era stills of actress Rita Hayworth on the cover and on every page. The idea came from Warhol collaborator and filmmaker Paul Morrissey, who told Colacello, “Just put one on every page and it’ll be funny.”

In the early days, complimentary copies of Interview were often given away to the "in-crowd"; this was the start of the magazine's circulation. Over time, Warhol withdrew from everyday oversight of Interview but he continued to act as ambassador for the magazine, distributing issues in the street to passersby and creating ad hoc signing events. From 1972 to 1989, the artist Richard Bernstein created covers of Interview, giving the publication its signature style.

Brant Publications period
The magazine's format has remained consistent at 60% features and 40% glossy advertising. It has been published by Brant Publications, Inc since shortly after Warhol's death in 1987. It was helmed for 18 years by Ingrid Sischy, until she and Peter Brant's ex-wife Sandra became lovers and left the magazine, selling Ms. Brant's half-ownership stake in the parent company Brant Publications. For a year and a half the magazine was in flux, edited by Christopher Bollen.

2008 to 2018
Interview restarted under co-editorial directors Fabien Baron and Glenn O'Brien in September 2008, with a cover featuring Kate Moss. Stephen Mooallem and Christopher Bollen served as the working editor-in-chief and editor-at-large, respectively. The publication's content can be found online and via an app, Other Edition, available on iTunes.

As of 2017, Fabien Baron was the editorial director; Karl Templer was creative director; Nick Haramis was editor-in-chief. In December 2013, Stephen Mooallem left Interview to join Harper’s Bazaar as its executive editor. Keith Pollock served as editor-in-chief from 2014 to 2016.

It was announced on May 21, 2018 that the publication ‘folded’ and would end both its print and web publications by the end of 2018. The publication also filed for Chapter 7 bankruptcy and liquidation.

Relaunch 
On September 6, 2018, Interview announced the launch of its 521st issue. The magazine was purchased by Kelly Brant and Jason Nikic, with some reports suggesting that the title's intellectual property will be returned to Peter Brant.

In other media and popular culture
The magazine is featured in The CW's television series The Carrie Diaries, a prequel to HBO's Sex and the City. The protagonist, played by actress AnnaSophia Robb, vicariously explores New York City through the fashion editor of Interview, played by Freema Agyeman.

References

External links
 
 

1969 establishments in New York City
Magazines established in 1969
Monthly magazines published in the United States
Andy Warhol
Cultural magazines published in the United States
Contemporary art magazines
Magazines published in New York City